Harold Henderson was a British politician.

Harold Henderson may also refer to:

Harold Gould Henderson, American Japanologist
Harold Lloyd Henderson, Canadian Presbyterian minister and politician
Harold Paulk Henderson, American political scientist
Harold Henderson (ice hockey) in 1897 AHAC season
Harold Henderson, the author of Let's Kill Dick and Jane, a book critical of the Dick and Jane book series

See also
Harold R. Henderson Pavilion
Harry Henderson (disambiguation)